The 1921 Princeton Tigers football team represented Princeton University in the 1921 college football season. The team finished with a 4–3 record under eighth-year head coach Bill Roper. Princeton guard Stan Keck was a consensus first-team honoree on the 1921 College Football All-America Team, and two other players (center Al Wittmer and an end with the surname Sniveley) were selected as first-team All-Americans by at least one selector.

Schedule

References

Princeton
Princeton Tigers football seasons
Princeton Tigers football